Jabal Samhan Nature Reserve is a nature reserve in the area of Jabal Samḥān ("Mount Samhan") in Dhofar, Oman. Being in the region of the Dhofar Mountains, it is one of the last refuges for wild Arabian leopards.

Data suggests that around twenty Arabian leopards left in the reserve.

Fauna 
The most important leopard prey species are Arabian gazelle, Nubian ibex, Cape hare, rock hyrax, Indian crested porcupine, desert hedgehog and several bird species. Occasionally leopards might prey on domestic livestock. Other predators, which are found in the reserve, include caracal, striped hyena and Arabian wolf.

See also 
 Wildlife of Oman

References

External links 
 Leopard in Jabal Samhan

Protected areas of Oman